Physella parkeri, the Broadshoulder Physa,  is a species of small air-breathing freshwater snail.

It is an aquatic gastropod mollusk in the family Physidae.

Like others in the family, this species is sinistral or left-handed.

Distribution 

The subspecies Physella parkeri latchfordi, also known as the "Gatineau tadpole snail", lives in Quebec, Canada. It was categorized as "Data Deficient" (DD) by the Committee on the Status of Endangered Wildlife in Canada (COSEWIC).

References

parkeri
Molluscs of Canada
Gastropods described in 1881